The Dunn County Courthouse on Owens St. in Manning, North Dakota was listed on the National Register of Historic Places.  It was delisted in 2009.  The listing had contained a  area.

In 1985, its NRHP nomination noted "a considerable integrity of feeling from the original courthouse in the appearance of the present building," which was by then no longer a courthouse.

References

Courthouses on the National Register of Historic Places in North Dakota
County courthouses in North Dakota
Government buildings completed in 1915
Former National Register of Historic Places in North Dakota
National Register of Historic Places in Dunn County, North Dakota
1915 establishments in North Dakota
Former National Historic Landmarks of the United States